Louis Bennett may refer to:

Louis Bennett II (born 1995), American soccer player
Louis Bennett Jr. (1894–1918), American pilot in World War I
Louis Bennett (politician) (died 1959), New York lawyer and politicia
Louis Bennett (soccer), English-American soccer coachn

See also
Louie Bennett (1870–1956), Irish suffragette
Louise Bennett-Coverley (1919–2006), Jamaican poet
Louis Bennett Field, airport located in West Virginia